Pedro Agustín Girón y de Las Casas, 1st Duke of Ahumada, 4th Marquess of the Amarillas (1778–1842) was a Spanish military officer and politician. The son of a general, he fought against the French during the French Revolutionary Wars. During the Napoleonic Wars he became a general officer and again fought the French. In later life he held military and political positions.

Biography
Born into a noble family in San Sebastián in 1778, Pedro Agustín Girón's father was Jerónimo Girón-Moctezuma, 3rd Marquis de las Amarilas and his mother Isabel de las Casas y Aragorri. He was a tenth generation descendant of Aztec Emperor Moctezuma II. He became an official of the Guardia Real and participated in the War of the Pyrenees in the Army of Catalonia, in which his father was a high-ranking general.

After Emperor Napoleon I of France invaded Spain and overthrew the monarchy, Girón offered his services to the patriotic forces in the Peninsular War (also known as the Spanish War of Independence). He participated in the Battle of Bailén in July 1808 and defeated the French. Later in the year, he fought at the Battle of Tudela in Navarre. In 1809, he served at the Battle of Uclés and in 1811 at the Battle of Albuera. In 1813, the French forces were driven out of Spain after the Battle of Vitoria, which Girón missed because his troops moved in the direction of Bilbao. On 7 October 1813 during the Battle of the Bidassoa, Girón commanded the two Andalusian divisions of Generals Virues and La Torre. Though the Spanish repeatedly attacked the French defenses at Larrun (905 meters alt.), they failed to capture the position. The Marquess of Wellington praised his allies' performance, writing that the Spanish attacked, "in as good order and with as much spirit as any that I have seen made by any troops." The French abandoned the peak the next day to avoid being trapped. Girón also led the two divisions, with 7,653 soldiers in all, at the Battle of Nivelle on 10 November, where his troops helped take the fortified village of Sare.

When his father died in 1819, Girón became the 4th Marquis of Amarilas. A moderate liberal in the political plain, after the liberal revolution of 1820, he was named Minister of the War of the Government under Evaristo Pérez de Castro. However he resigned in just a few months because of the opposition of the more radical liberal sector.

In 1832, in the last years of the reign of Fernando VII, he was designated Commander in chief of Granada. The following year he was bestowed the title Duque de Ahumada. In 1835 he was named Minister of the War again, but was forced to resign after being accused of nepotism. During the last few years of his life he spent many years abroad and traveled, and dedicated his time to study and writing. His memoirs Memories 1778-1837 offers an insight into his life. He died in 1842.

Pedro's son, Francisco Javier Girón y Ezpeleta, 2nd Duke of Ahumada and 5th Marquess of the Amarillas, founded the Spanish Guardia Civil in 1844.

Footnotes

References

Books
 Glover, Michael. The Peninsular War 1807-1814. London: Penguin, 2001. 
 Smith, Digby. The Napoleonic Wars Data Book. London: Greenhill, 1998. 

1778 births
1842 deaths
Spanish generals
Spanish commanders of the Napoleonic Wars
Marquesses of Spain
Government ministers of Spain
Presidents of the Senate of Spain